The IAR-23 and IAR-24 were low-wing monoplane light multipurpose aircraft with a conventional undercarriage, built by IAR of Romania.

Development
The IAR-23 was created in 1934 by the Romanian company Industria Aeronautică Română (IAR) as an attempt to design a next-generation fighter for the Royal Romanian Air Force, but because its low power, it was classified only as a civilian touring aircraft. However, it contained many advanced features for its time, including uniquely designed wings. After the installation of additional fuel tanks, it turned into a long-haul touring plane, with a maximum range of 2300 km.

An improved version, the IAR-24, was created in 1935. It used the same airframe, but had a modernized cockpit and a slightly more powerful engine that yielded a higher cruising speed.

Operators
The sole IAR-23 built was registered YR-IAR. and delivered to Major G. Bănciulescu in September 1934, who undertook several cross country flights with the aircraft through Europe (from Bucharest to Warsaw, Prague and Vienna). The next year, the IAR-23 was flown to Tel-Aviv and back.

The sole IAR-24 was registered YR-ACI. The fates of both aircraft are unknown.

Specifications (IAR-23)

References

1930s Romanian airliners
23
Aircraft first flown in 1934